See You Tonight is the third studio album by American country music singer Scotty McCreery. It was released on October 15, 2013, by Mercury Nashville. The album is produced by Frank Rogers with the exception of two tracks produced by Mark Bright.

The album garnered a positive reception from critics who praised McCreery's improved musicianship over a plethora of well-balanced songs. See You Tonight debuted at number 6 on the Billboard 200 and spawned two singles: the title track and "Feelin' It". As of April 2015, the album has sold 269,900 copies in the United States.

Background
Scotty McCreery recorded the album while he was attending North Carolina State University. The producer of the album was Frank Rogers.  McCreery co-wrote 5 of the tracks of the album, including the title track which he co-wrote with songwriter Ashley Gorley and Zach Crowell. He also collaborated with Alison Krauss on "Carolina Moon" where she provides backing vocals. He considered "Carolina Moon" to be his favorite track on the album.

Reception

The album received generally positive reviews from music critics, with an overall Metacritic rating of 73 indicating "generally favorable reviews".  Stephen Thomas Erlewine of AllMusic found that the sound of the album has changed from the old-fashioned country of the first album, that its modern country sound is so "glossy and effervescent" making it seem McCreery's voice had jumped a couple of octave. He considered that McCreery had redefined himself as a "sports bar-hopping bro" in the album, but nevertheless thought the album works. Chuck Dauphin of Billboard thought that McCreery and the producers did well in stretching his music wings in the album, with positive reviews for most of the tracks.

Grady Smith of Entertainment Weekly felt that the first half of the album "bogs down under too much by-the-numbers rock-country," but "hits its stride in the smoother second half". Tammy Ragusa of Country Weekly concurred that the album seems at times "a bit formulaic, with songs that subscribe to what is currently hitting big on country radio", but also thought it "exhilarating to hear Scotty stretch out, both in content and vocals". Matt Bjorke of Roughstock considered that the "hook-filled, radio-ready 'summer songs'" in the album are counterbalanced with strong, mid-tempo songs as well as traditional ballads, and thought that the album showed "a remarkable amount of growth and maturity" for McCreery. Billy Duke of Taste of Country was enthusiastic about the album, calling it "dynamic", and thought the songwriting and production "sharp".

Commercial performance
The album debuted as the number 1 country album and the number 6 album on the US Billboard 200, selling 52,000 copies. It also debuted at No. 3 on the Top Internet Albums and No. 10 on the Top Digital Albums charts. As of April 2015, the album has sold 269,900 copies in the US.

Track listing

Personnel
Adapted from liner notes.

All tracks except 7 & 16
David Angell - violin
Jim "Moose" Brown - piano, B-3 organ, Wurlitzer
Wei Tsun Chang - violin
J.T. Corenflos - electric guitar
Eric Darken - percussion
David Davidson - violin
Shannon Forrest - drums
Aubrey Haynie - fiddle
Wes Hightower - background vocals
Jedd Hughes - acoustic guitar, electric guitar
Kirk "Jelly Roll" Johnson - harmonica
Mike Johnson - pedal steel guitar, dobro
Alison Krauss - featured vocals on "Carolina Moon"
Anthony LaMarchina - cello
Rachel Loy - bass guitar
Scotty McCreery - lead vocals
Greg Morrow - drums
Gordon Mote - piano, B-3 organ, Wurlitzer
Jon Randall - background vocals
Frank Rogers - baritone guitar, electric guitar, keyboards, programming, background vocals
Bryan Sutton - electric guitar, mandolin
Russell Terrell - background vocals
Ilya Toshinsky - acoustic guitar, electric guitar, mandolin, banjo, bouzouki
Derek Wells - acoustic guitar, electric guitar
Matthew West - background vocals
Kris Wilkinson - viola, string arrangements

Tracks 7 & 16
Perry Coleman - background vocals
Shannon Forrest - drums
Aubrey Haynie - fiddle
Charlie Judge - B-3 organ, keyboards, synthesizer
Brent Mason - electric guitar
Scotty McCreery - lead vocals
Jimmy Nichols - piano, Wurlitzer
Jimmie Lee Sloas - bass guitar
Russell Terrell - background vocals
Ilya Toshinsky - acoustic guitar, banjo, ganjo
Jennifer Wrinkle - background vocals

Singles
The title track, "See You Tonight", the album's first single was released on April 9, 2013. It was his first Top Ten hit on the country charts.

The second single, "Feelin' It", was released to country radio on April 14, 2014.

Chart performance

Weekly charts

Year-end charts

Singles

Release date

References

2013 albums
Scotty McCreery albums
Albums produced by Frank Rogers (record producer)
Mercury Nashville albums
19 Recordings albums